Repton is a town in Conecuh County, Alabama, United States. It was incorporated on January 10, 1899. At the 2020 census, the population was 235.

Geography
Repton is located in western Conecuh County at  (31.408991, -87.239326).

Demographics

As of the census of 2000, there were 280 people, 103 households, and 77 families residing in the town. The racial makeup of the town was 66.79% White, 31.79% Black or African American, 0.71% from other races, and 0.71% from two or more races. 0.71% of the population were Hispanic or Latino of any race.

There were 103 households, out of which 32.0% had children under the age of 18 living with them, 55.3% were married couples living together, 14.6% had a female householder with no husband present, and 25.2% were non-families. 23.3% of all households were made up of individuals, and 7.8% had someone living alone who was 65 years of age or older. The average household size was 2.72 and the average family size was 3.21.

In the town, the population was spread out, with 26.8% under the age of 18, 10.4% from 18 to 24, 25.4% from 25 to 44, 22.5% from 45 to 64, and 15.0% who were 65 years of age or older. The median age was 35 years. For every 100 females, there were 95.8 males. For every 100 females age 18 and over, there were 86.4 males.

The median income for a household in the town was $22,083, and the median income for a family was $28,281. Males had a median income of $29,583 versus $18,929 for females. The per capita income for the town was $12,469. About 15.6% of families and 16.7% of the population were below the poverty line, including 27.9% of those under the age of eighteen and 16.9% of those 65 or over.

Education 
Repton Junior High School

References

External links
Town of Repton official website
Coastal Gateway Regional Economic Development Alliance

Towns in Conecuh County, Alabama
Towns in Alabama